Pa'auilo is a census-designated place (CDP) in Hawaii County, Hawaii, United States. The population was 618 at the 2020 census.

Geography
Pa'auilo is located on the northeast side of the island of Hawaii at  (20.043769, -155.370323). Hawaii Route 19 passes through the community, leading southeast  to Hilo and west  to Waimea.

Demographics

As of the census of 2000, there were 571 people, 191 households, and 141 families residing in the CDP. The racial makeup of the CDP was 15.06% White, 0.18% African American, 0.70% Native American, 41.68% Asian, 5.60% Pacific Islander, 0.88% from other races, and 35.90% from two or more races. Hispanic or Latino of any race were 13.49% of the population.

There were 191 households, out of which 31.4% had children under the age of 18 living with them, 53.4% were married couples living together, 14.1% had a female householder with no husband present, and 25.7% were non-families. 20.9% of all households were made up of individuals, and 10.5% had someone living alone who was 65 years of age or older.  The average household size was 2.99 and the average family size was 3.50.

In the CDP the population was spread out, with 28.7% under the age of 18, 7.9% from 18 to 24, 23.5% from 25 to 44, 23.5% from 45 to 64, and 16.5% who were 65 years of age or older.  The median age was 37 years. For every 100 females, there were 101.8 males.  For every 100 females age 18 and over, there were 105.6 males.

The median income for a household in the CDP was $34,659, and the median income for a family was $34,792. Males had a median income of $23,750 versus $25,000 for females. The per capita income for the CDP was $13,477.  About 11.3% of families and 12.3% of the population were below the poverty line, including 16.7% of those under age 18 and 8.5% of those age 65 or over.

See also

 List of places in Hawaii

References

External links

Census-designated places in Hawaii County, Hawaii
Populated places on Hawaii (island)
Populated coastal places in Hawaii